Death for Life is the fourth studio album by American hardcore punk band Death by Stereo, released on June 7, 2005.

This release is much heavier than any of Death By Stereo's previous work, but it also includes the first ever ballad-like Death By Stereo song, "Forever and a Day", which was also re-recorded for the band's following album, Death Is My Only Friend.  The closing track on their second album "Day of the Death" has the same name as this album, "Death For Life".

Track listing

All tracks written by Death by Stereo except "Entombed We Collide", being written by Death by Stereo and Mark Renk.

Personnel 
 Efrem Schulz - vocals
 Dan Palmer - lead guitar, backing vocals
 Tim "Tito" Owens - rhythm guitar, backing vocals
 Tyler Rebbe - bass guitar, backing vocals
 Todd Hennig - drums, backing vocals
 M. Shadows of Avenged Sevenfold (additional vocals, tracks 4 and 11)
 Scott Gilman (strings and programming)
 Derek Whitacre (live samples)
 Produced, mixed and recorded by The Factory (Fred Achambault and Bruce MacFarlane)
 Recorded at Sound City, Ton Recording and The Scene
 Mixed at Ton Recording and Al's Hobby Shop
 Assistant engineered by Pete Martinez (Sound City)
 Mastered by John Golden
 Artwork and design by Paul A. Romano
 Mark Renk – vocal coach
 Gardner Knutson – drum technician

References

Death by Stereo albums
2005 albums
Epitaph Records albums